Erwin Strempel (6 January 1924 – 17 October 1999) was a German footballer who played internationally for the Saarland national football team.

References

1924 births
1999 deaths
Association football goalkeepers
Saar footballers
Saarland international footballers
1. FC Saarbrücken players
Borussia Neunkirchen players
German footballers
People from Saarpfalz-Kreis
Footballers from Saarland